Jenny Clève (3 April 1930 – 17 February 2023) was a French actress.

Biography
Born in Roubaix on 3 April 1930, Clève was the daughter of André Clève and Marie Debode. She left her hometown during World War II and stayed with her father's cousins in Vernou-sur-Brenne. She returned to Roubaix in 1948 and was admitted to the Conservatoire de Roubaix, where she met , whom she married on 3 April 1951. The couple had four children: Nadine, Éric, Corinne, and Franck. Her granddaughter, also became an actress. On 28 May 2019, she became the godmother of processional giant of Sailly-lez-Lannoy, Jean Gab'Lou.

Clève died in Tourcoing on 17 February 2023, at the age of 92.

Filmography
La Chair de l'orchidée (1975)
Les Ambassadeurs (1975)
F comme Fairbanks (1976)
Docteur Françoise Gailland (1976)
Calmos (1976)
Monsieur Klein (1976)
Shadow of the Castles (1977)
 (1977)
 (1978)
Dossier 51 (1978)
Mais ou et donc Ornicar (1979)
 (1980)
One Deadly Summer (1983)
Winter 1960 (1983)
La Garce (1984)
Code Name: Emerald (1985)
 (1988)
Les Enfants du naufrageur (1992)
 (1992)
Germinal (1993)
Élisa (1995)
 (1996)
Lucie Aubrac (1997)
XXL (1997)
The Children of the Marshland (1999)
A Crime in Paradise (2001)
Welcome to the Sticks (2008)
Arrêtez-moi (2013)
Brèves de comptoir (2014)

References

1930 births
2023 deaths
20th-century French actresses
21st-century French actresses
People from Roubaix